Równopole  is a village in the administrative district of Gmina Kaczory, within Piła County, Greater Poland Voivodeship, in west-central Poland.

Notable people
 

Lazar Dobricz (1881–1970), Bulgarian circus artist

References

Villages in Piła County